Sooke Potholes may refer to:

 Sooke Potholes Regional Park - operated by Capital Regional District and The Land Conservancy of British Columbia
 Sooke Potholes Provincial Park - operated by British Columbia Ministry of Environment